The 1942 Pittsburgh Pirates season was the 61st season of the Pittsburgh Pirates franchise; the 56th in the National League. The Pirates finished fifth in the league standings with a record of 66–81.

Offseason 
 December 1, 1941: Hank Gornicki was selected off waivers by the Pirates from the St. Louis Cardinals.

Regular season

Season standings

Record vs. opponents

Game log

|- bgcolor="ccffcc"
| 1 || April 14 || @ Reds || 4–2 || Butcher (1–0) || Walters || — || 34,104 || 1–0
|- bgcolor="ccffcc"
| 2 || April 15 || @ Reds || 6–2 || Dietz (1–0) || Riddle || — || 3,628 || 2–0
|- bgcolor="ffbbbb"
| 3 || April 16 || @ Reds || 7–8 (12) || Beggs || Wilkie (0–1) || — || 2,421 || 2–1
|- bgcolor="ccffcc"
| 4 || April 17 || Cardinals || 3–2 || Sewell (1–0) || Warneke || — || 18,324 || 3–1
|- bgcolor="ccffcc"
| 5 || April 18 || Cardinals || 3–0 || Heintzelman (1–0) || White || — || 5,945 || 4–1
|- bgcolor="ffbbbb"
| 6 || April 19 || Cardinals || 2–3 || Beazley || Dietz (1–1) || Gumbert || 12,929 || 4–2
|- bgcolor="ffbbbb"
| 7 || April 20 || Cubs || 2–8 || Mooty || Butcher (1–1) || — || 1,752 || 4–3
|- bgcolor="ccffcc"
| 8 || April 21 || Cubs || 5–2 || Sewell (2–0) || Bithorn || — || 2,397 || 5–3
|- bgcolor="ccffcc"
| 9 || April 22 || Cubs || 9–1 || Hamlin (1–0) || Erickson || — || 3,517 || 6–3
|- bgcolor="ffbbbb"
| 10 || April 23 || Reds || 3–5 || Vander Meer || Lanning (0–1) || — || 4,533 || 6–4
|- bgcolor="ffbbbb"
| 11 || April 24 || Reds || 5–9 || Starr || Dietz (1–2) || Beggs || 4,971 || 6–5
|- bgcolor="ccffcc"
| 12 || April 26 || @ Cardinals || 2–0 || Heintzelman (2–0) || Warneke || — || — || 7–5
|- bgcolor="ffffff"
| 13 || April 26 || @ Cardinals || 4–4 (11) ||  ||  || — || 14,820 || 7–5
|- bgcolor="ccffcc"
| 14 || April 28 || Phillies || 7–1 || Butcher (2–1) || Naylor || — || 1,752 || 8–5
|- bgcolor="ccffcc"
| 15 || April 29 || Phillies || 7–6 (10) || Sewell (3–0) || Blanton || — || 1,567 || 9–5
|- bgcolor="ffbbbb"
| 16 || April 30 || Phillies || 3–6 || Hoerst || Lanning (0–2) || — || 1,826 || 9–6
|-

|- bgcolor="ccffcc"
| 17 || May 1 || Dodgers || 7–6 || Heintzelman (3–0) || Allen || — || 9,199 || 10–6
|- bgcolor="ccffcc"
| 18 || May 2 || Dodgers || 10–5 || Wilkie (1–1) || Davis || — || 17,210 || 11–6
|- bgcolor="ccffcc"
| 19 || May 3 || Braves || 6–2 || Butcher (3–1) || Javery || — || — || 12–6
|- bgcolor="ffbbbb"
| 20 || May 3 || Braves || 3–12 (8) || Earley || Sewell (3–1) || — || 29,030 || 12–7
|- bgcolor="ccffcc"
| 21 || May 4 || Braves || 2–1 || Klinger (1–0) || Tobin || — || 1,637 || 13–7
|- bgcolor="ffbbbb"
| 22 || May 5 || Braves || 1–7 || Wallace || Dietz (1–3) || — || 2,321 || 13–8
|- bgcolor="ccffcc"
| 23 || May 7 || Giants || 2–1 (11) || Wilkie (2–1) || Carpenter || — || — || 14–8
|- bgcolor="ffbbbb"
| 24 || May 7 || Giants || 2–6 || Koslo || Heintzelman (3–1) || — || 4,075 || 14–9
|- bgcolor="ccffcc"
| 25 || May 8 || @ Cubs || 6–4 || Sewell (4–1) || Schmitz || — || 4,133 || 15–9
|- bgcolor="ffbbbb"
| 26 || May 9 || @ Cubs || 1–3 || Lee || Butcher (3–2) || — || 3,465 || 15–10
|- bgcolor="ffbbbb"
| 27 || May 10 || @ Cubs || 2–4 || Passeau || Hamlin (1–1) || — || 22,042 || 15–11
|- bgcolor="ccffcc"
| 28 || May 10 || @ Cubs || 3–2 || Klinger (2–0) || Erickson || — || 22,042 || 16–11
|- bgcolor="ffbbbb"
| 29 || May 12 || @ Giants || 3–7 || Melton || Heintzelman (3–2) || — || — || 16–12
|- bgcolor="ccffcc"
| 30 || May 13 || @ Giants || 3–1 || Butcher (4–2) || Koslo || — || — || 17–12
|- bgcolor="ffbbbb"
| 31 || May 14 || @ Dodgers || 4–7 || French || Wilkie (2–2) || Casey || — || 17–13
|- bgcolor="ffbbbb"
| 32 || May 15 || @ Dodgers || 3–8 || Wyatt || Sewell (4–2) || — || — || 17–14
|- bgcolor="ffbbbb"
| 33 || May 16 || @ Dodgers || 1–8 || Head || Heintzelman (3–3) || — || — || 17–15
|- bgcolor="ccffcc"
| 34 || May 17 || @ Phillies || 7–2 || Hamlin (2–1) || Hoerst || — || — || 18–15
|- bgcolor="ffbbbb"
| 35 || May 17 || @ Phillies || 4–5 (11) || Melton || Klinger (2–1) || — || — || 18–16
|- bgcolor="ffbbbb"
| 36 || May 19 || @ Phillies || 4–5 || Podgajny || Butcher (4–3) || Hoerst || 3,366 || 18–17
|- bgcolor="ffbbbb"
| 37 || May 20 || @ Braves || 3–4 (10) || Sain || Heintzelman (3–4) || — || 3,010 || 18–18
|- bgcolor="ccffcc"
| 38 || May 23 || Cubs || 5–4 || Lanning (1–2) || Erickson || Sewell (1) || 3,090 || 19–18
|- bgcolor="ffbbbb"
| 39 || May 24 || Cubs || 5–7 (10) || Lee || Sewell (4–3) || — || 16,746 || 19–19
|- bgcolor="ffbbbb"
| 40 || May 24 || Cubs || 4–11 || Passeau || Heintzelman (3–5) || — || 16,746 || 19–20
|- bgcolor="ffbbbb"
| 41 || May 25 || @ Reds || 1–6 || Derringer || Butcher (4–4) || — || 16,205 || 19–21
|- bgcolor="ffbbbb"
| 42 || May 27 || Cardinals || 3–5 || Beazley || Sewell (4–4) || — || 1,635 || 19–22
|- bgcolor="ffbbbb"
| 43 || May 28 || Cardinals || 2–3 (11) || Beazley || Wilkie (2–3) || Gumbert || 16,577 || 19–23
|- bgcolor="ffbbbb"
| 44 || May 30 || @ Cubs || 5–10 || Mooty || Gornicki (0–1) || Pressnell || — || 19–24
|- bgcolor="ffbbbb"
| 45 || May 30 || @ Cubs || 2–3 || Fleming || Hamlin (2–2) || Pressnell || 22,735 || 19–25
|- bgcolor="ffbbbb"
| 46 || May 31 || @ Reds || 2–8 || Walters || Sewell (4–5) || — || — || 19–26
|- bgcolor="ffbbbb"
| 47 || May 31 || @ Reds || 0–3 || Starr || Butcher (4–5) || — || 16,721 || 19–27
|-

|- bgcolor="ffbbbb"
| 48 || June 2 || Dodgers || 2–17 || Webber || Wilkie (2–4) || — || 3,257 || 19–28
|- bgcolor="ccffcc"
| 49 || June 5 || Phillies || 6–5 || Heintzelman (4–5) || Hoerst || Dietz (1) || 1,195 || 20–28
|- bgcolor="ccffcc"
| 50 || June 6 || Phillies || 3–1 || Sewell (5–5) || Hughes || — || 2,184 || 21–28
|- bgcolor="ccffcc"
| 51 || June 7 || Phillies || 5–4 (10) || Heintzelman (5–5) || Johnson || — || — || 22–28
|- bgcolor="ccffcc"
| 52 || June 7 || Phillies || 8–6 (7) || Lanning (2–2) || Melton || Wilkie (1) || 8,461 || 23–28
|- bgcolor="ccffcc"
| 53 || June 9 || Braves || 10–2 || Heintzelman (6–5) || Tost || — || 1,871 || 24–28
|- bgcolor="ccffcc"
| 54 || June 10 || Braves || 3–0 || Sewell (6–5) || Tobin || — || 11,533 || 25–28
|- bgcolor="ccffcc"
| 55 || June 13 || Giants || 8–2 || Klinger (3–1) || Melton || — || 4,096 || 26–28
|- bgcolor="ffbbbb"
| 56 || June 14 || Giants || 3–4 || Carpenter || Heintzelman (6–6) || — || 16,719 || 26–29
|- bgcolor="ccffcc"
| 57 || June 14 || Giants || 8–3 (8) || Sewell (7–5) || Sunkel || — || 16,719 || 27–29
|- bgcolor="ffbbbb"
| 58 || June 15 || Giants || 2–6 || Schumacher || Butcher (4–6) || — || — || 27–30
|- bgcolor="ffbbbb"
| 59 || June 16 || @ Phillies || 1–5 || Podgajny || Hamlin (2–3) || — || 1,196 || 27–31
|- bgcolor="ccffcc"
| 60 || June 17 || @ Phillies || 6–1 || Klinger (4–1) || Hoerst || — || — || 28–31
|- bgcolor="ccffcc"
| 61 || June 19 || @ Braves || 7–6 (11) || Dietz (2–3) || Sain || — || 3,304 || 29–31
|- bgcolor="ffbbbb"
| 62 || June 20 || @ Braves || 0–4 || Javery || Heintzelman (6–7) || — || — || 29–32
|- bgcolor="ccffcc"
| 63 || June 21 || @ Braves || 7–3 (10) || Butcher (5–6) || Errickson || — || 5,000 || 30–32
|- bgcolor="ffbbbb"
| 64 || June 23 || @ Dodgers || 2–6 || French || Klinger (4–2) || — || 16,080 || 30–33
|- bgcolor="ffbbbb"
| 65 || June 26 || @ Giants || 2–4 || Melton || Sewell (7–6) || — || 7,585 || 30–34
|- bgcolor="ffbbbb"
| 66 || June 27 || @ Giants || 2–5 || Carpenter || Heintzelman (6–8) || — || 4,100 || 30–35
|- bgcolor="ccffcc"
| 67 || June 28 || @ Giants || 8–7 || Wilkie (3–4) || Adams || — || — || 31–35
|- bgcolor="ccffcc"
| 68 || June 28 || @ Giants || 9–3 || Klinger (5–2) || Schumacher || — || 31,505 || 32–35
|- bgcolor="ffbbbb"
| 69 || June 30 || @ Cardinals || 2–4 || Cooper || Sewell (7–7) || — || 13,252 || 32–36
|-

|- bgcolor="ffbbbb"
| 70 || July 1 || @ Cardinals || 0–4 || White || Heintzelman (6–9) || — || 1,439 || 32–37
|- bgcolor="ffbbbb"
| 71 || July 2 || @ Cardinals || 1–3 || Beazley || Klinger (5–3) || — || 8,699 || 32–38
|- bgcolor="ccffcc"
| 72 || July 3 || @ Cardinals || 5–4 || Lanning (3–2) || Warneke || Dietz (2) || 1,169 || 33–38
|- bgcolor="ffbbbb"
| 73 || July 4 || Reds || 0–2 || Walters || Butcher (5–7) || — || 18,000 || 33–39
|- bgcolor="ccffcc"
| 74 || July 5 || Reds || 4–3 || Sewell (8–7) || Derringer || — || — || 34–39
|- bgcolor="ffbbbb"
| 75 || July 5 || Reds || 2–5 || Starr || Hamlin (2–4) || — || 11,365 || 34–40
|- bgcolor="ccffcc"
| 76 || July 9 || Phillies || 9–0 || Sewell (9–7) || Melton || — || 29,488 || 35–40
|- bgcolor="ccffcc"
| 77 || July 11 || Phillies || 12–5 || Wilkie (4–4) || Pearson || — || 2,034 || 36–40
|- bgcolor="ffbbbb"
| 78 || July 12 || Dodgers || 1–2 || French || Lanning (3–3) || — || — || 36–41
|- bgcolor="ccffcc"
| 79 || July 12 || Dodgers || 6–4 || Heintzelman (7–9) || Higbe || Sewell (2) || 29,543 || 37–41
|- bgcolor="ffbbbb"
| 80 || July 14 || Dodgers || 1–5 || Wyatt || Klinger (5–4) || — || 21,254 || 37–42
|- bgcolor="ccffcc"
| 81 || July 15 || Giants || 6–2 || Sewell (10–7) || Carpenter || — || 2,394 || 38–42
|- bgcolor="ffbbbb"
| 82 || July 16 || Giants || 1–3 || Hubbell || Butcher (5–8) || — || 9,098 || 38–43
|- bgcolor="ffbbbb"
| 83 || July 17 || Giants || 2–11 || Schumacher || Lanning (3–4) || Adams || 2,083 || 38–44
|- bgcolor="ccffcc"
| 84 || July 18 || Braves || 3–0 || Heintzelman (8–9) || Javery || — || — || 39–44
|- bgcolor="ccffcc"
| 85 || July 19 || Braves || 8–7 || Dietz (3–3) || Errickson || — || — || 40–44
|- bgcolor="ccffcc"
| 86 || July 19 || Braves || 9–0 (8) || Klinger (6–4) || Salvo || — || 7,425 || 41–44
|- bgcolor="ffbbbb"
| 87 || July 20 || Dodgers || 0–5 || French || Lanning (3–5) || — || 13,600 || 41–45
|- bgcolor="ffbbbb"
| 88 || July 21 || @ Giants || 5–6 || Hubbell || Wilkie (4–5) || — || 8,937 || 41–46
|- bgcolor="ffbbbb"
| 89 || July 23 || @ Giants || 4–6 || McGee || Sewell (10–8) || — || 5,555 || 41–47
|- bgcolor="ffbbbb"
| 90 || July 24 || @ Dodgers || 4–6 || Wyatt || Heintzelman (8–10) || — || 10,798 || 41–48
|- bgcolor="ccffcc"
| 91 || July 25 || @ Dodgers || 4–1 || Gornicki (1–1) || Davis || — || 11,314 || 42–48
|- bgcolor="ffbbbb"
| 92 || July 26 || @ Dodgers || 2–3 || Allen || Klinger (6–5) || Head || — || 42–49
|- bgcolor="ffbbbb"
| 93 || July 26 || @ Dodgers || 3–5 || Macon || Lanning (3–6) || Head || 31,844 || 42–50
|- bgcolor="ffbbbb"
| 94 || July 28 || @ Braves || 3–4 || Tost || Dietz (3–4) || — || 1,527 || 42–51
|- bgcolor="ccffcc"
| 95 || July 29 || @ Braves || 3–0 || Sewell (11–8) || Javery || — || — || 43–51
|- bgcolor="ffbbbb"
| 96 || July 29 || @ Braves || 5–6 || Tobin || Klinger (6–6) || — || 4,064 || 43–52
|-

|- bgcolor="ffbbbb"
| 97 || August 1 || @ Phillies || 1–2 (12) || Hughes || Sewell (11–9) || — || — || 43–53
|- bgcolor="ccffcc"
| 98 || August 2 || @ Phillies || 4–2 || Hamlin (3–4) || Melton || — || — || 44–53
|- bgcolor="ccffcc"
| 99 || August 2 || @ Phillies || 3–2 || Dietz (4–4) || Hoerst || Butcher (1) || — || 45–53
|- bgcolor="ccffcc"
| 100 || August 4 || Cubs || 2–1 (11) || Klinger (7–6) || Bithorn || — || 2,042 || 46–53
|- bgcolor="ccffcc"
| 101 || August 5 || Cubs || 3–0 || Sewell (12–9) || Fleming || — || 8,826 || 47–53
|- bgcolor="ccffcc"
| 102 || August 7 || Cardinals || 13–6 || Wilkie (5–5) || Lanier || — || 10,430 || 48–53
|- bgcolor="ffffff"
| 103 || August 8 || Cardinals || 5–5 (16) ||  ||  || — || 2,128 || 48–53
|- bgcolor="ffbbbb"
| 104 || August 9 || Cardinals || 3–4 || Dickson || Lanning (3–7) || — || — || 48–54
|- bgcolor="ffbbbb"
| 105 || August 9 || Cardinals || 1–2 (8) || Krist || Klinger (7–7) || — || 15,561 || 48–55
|- bgcolor="ccffcc"
| 106 || August 10 || Cardinals || 6–4 || Wilkie (6–5) || Cooper || Dietz (3) || 1,507 || 49–55
|- bgcolor="ccffcc"
| 107 || August 11 || Reds || 3–1 || Gornicki (2–1) || Thompson || — || 2,108 || 50–55
|- bgcolor="ffbbbb"
| 108 || August 12 || Reds || 0–3 || Vander Meer || Sewell (12–10) || — || 8,114 || 50–56
|- bgcolor="ffbbbb"
| 109 || August 14 || @ Cubs || 1–7 || Warneke || Klinger (7–8) || — || 3,934 || 50–57
|- bgcolor="ccffcc"
| 110 || August 15 || @ Cubs || 8–5 || Dietz (5–4) || Bithorn || Lanning (1) || — || 51–57
|- bgcolor="ccffcc"
| 111 || August 15 || @ Cubs || 8–7 (11) || Sewell (13–10) || Errickson || — || 11,702 || 52–57
|- bgcolor="ffbbbb"
| 112 || August 16 || @ Cubs || 1–5 || Lee || Gornicki (2–2) || — || — || 52–58
|- bgcolor="ffbbbb"
| 113 || August 16 || @ Cubs || 1–4 || Fleming || Sewell (13–11) || — || 25,930 || 52–59
|- bgcolor="ccffcc"
| 114 || August 18 || @ Reds || 3–0 || Lanning (4–7) || Walters || — || 6,475 || 53–59
|- bgcolor="ccffcc"
| 115 || August 19 || @ Reds || 9–2 || Gornicki (3–2) || Derringer || — || 1,338 || 54–59
|- bgcolor="ffbbbb"
| 116 || August 20 || @ Reds || 3–5 || Vander Meer || Sewell (13–12) || — || 1,324 || 54–60
|- bgcolor="ffbbbb"
| 117 || August 21 || @ Cardinals || 2–10 || Beazley || Dietz (5–5) || — || 2,010 || 54–61
|- bgcolor="ffbbbb"
| 118 || August 22 || @ Cardinals || 6–7 || Lanier || Klinger (7–9) || — || 3,067 || 54–62
|- bgcolor="ccffcc"
| 119 || August 23 || @ Cardinals || 5–3 || Klinger (8–9) || Cooper || — || — || 55–62
|- bgcolor="ffbbbb"
| 120 || August 23 || @ Cardinals || 2–5 || Dickson || Lanning (4–8) || — || — || 55–63
|- bgcolor="ccffcc"
| 121 || August 25 || Braves || 6–0 || Sewell (14–12) || Earley || — || — || 56–63
|- bgcolor="ccffcc"
| 122 || August 27 || Braves || 5–0 || Gornicki (4–2) || Tobin || — || 4,106 || 57–63
|- bgcolor="ffbbbb"
| 123 || August 29 || Giants || 0–2 || Schumacher || Dietz (5–6) || — || — || 57–64
|- bgcolor="ffbbbb"
| 124 || August 29 || Giants || 4–7 || McGee || Klinger (8–10) || — || 5,212 || 57–65
|- bgcolor="ffbbbb"
| 125 || August 30 || Dodgers || 1–3 || Wyatt || Heintzelman (8–11) || Davis || — || 57–66
|- bgcolor="ccffcc"
| 126 || August 30 || Dodgers || 9–5 (8) || Sewell (15–12) || French || — || 26,377 || 58–66
|- bgcolor="ffbbbb"
| 127 || August 31 || Dodgers || 4–5 (11) || Davis || Gornicki (4–3) || — || 3,697 || 58–67
|-

|- bgcolor="ffbbbb"
| 128 || September 1 || Dodgers || 2–4 || Higbe || Klinger (8–11) || — || 4,437 || 58–68
|- bgcolor="ccffcc"
| 129 || September 2 || Phillies || 5–2 || Dietz (6–6) || Hoerst || — || 3,712 || 59–68
|- bgcolor="ffbbbb"
| 130 || September 4 || Cubs || 3–5 || Bithorn || Sewell (15–13) || — || 5,218 || 59–69
|- bgcolor="ccffcc"
| 131 || September 6 || Cubs || 6–0 || Gornicki (5–3) || Passeau || — || — || 60–69
|- bgcolor="ccffcc"
| 132 || September 6 || Cubs || 5–0 || Hamlin (4–4) || Fleming || — || 8,610 || 61–69
|- bgcolor="ccffcc"
| 133 || September 7 || Cardinals || 11–6 || Sewell (16–13) || Dickson || Klinger (1) || — || 62–69
|- bgcolor="ffbbbb"
| 134 || September 7 || Cardinals || 4–6 (8) || Beazley || Dietz (6–7) || — || 18,785 || 62–70
|- bgcolor="ffbbbb"
| 135 || September 8 || @ Dodgers || 0–4 || Head || Wilkie (6–6) || — || — || 62–71
|- bgcolor="ffbbbb"
| 136 || September 10 || @ Phillies || 1–2 (11) || Hughes || Dietz (6–8) || — || — || 62–72
|- bgcolor="ffbbbb"
| 137 || September 12 || @ Braves || 1–4 || Tobin || Gornicki (5–4) || — || — || 62–73
|- bgcolor="ffffff"
| 138 || September 12 || @ Braves || 2–2 (11) ||  ||  || — || — || 62–73
|- bgcolor="ffbbbb"
| 139 || September 13 || @ Giants || 0–5 || Carpenter || Sewell (16–14) || — || — || 62–74
|- bgcolor="ffbbbb"
| 140 || September 13 || @ Giants || 3–5 || McGee || Wilkie (6–7) || — || 17,794 || 62–75
|- bgcolor="ffbbbb"
| 141 || September 14 || @ Giants || 1–6 || Schumacher || Dietz (6–9) || — || 2,428 || 62–76
|- bgcolor="ffbbbb"
| 142 || September 16 || @ Dodgers || 3–10 || Wyatt || Gornicki (5–5) || — || 11,994 || 62–77
|- bgcolor="ccffcc"
| 143 || September 17 || @ Dodgers || 3–2 || Sewell (17–14) || Head || — || — || 63–77
|- bgcolor="ffbbbb"
| 144 || September 18 || Reds || 1–5 || Vander Meer || Hallett (0–1) || — || 5,154 || 63–78
|- bgcolor="ffbbbb"
| 145 || September 19 || Reds || 3–4 || Walters || Brandt (0–1) || — || 1,485 || 63–79
|- bgcolor="ccffcc"
| 146 || September 20 || Reds || 2–1 (13) || Lanning (5–8) || Shoun || — || — || 64–79
|- bgcolor="ffffff"
| 147 || September 20 || Reds || 3–3 (7) ||  ||  || — || 4,161 || 64–79
|- bgcolor="ffbbbb"
| 148 || September 21 || @ Cardinals || 1–2 || White || Gornicki (5–6) || — || 5,000 || 64–80
|- bgcolor="ffbbbb"
| 149 || September 22 || @ Cardinals || 3–9 || Gumbert || Sewell (17–15) || Dickson || 8,823 || 64–81
|- bgcolor="ccffcc"
| 150 || September 27 || @ Reds || 8–7 (12) || Lanning (6–8) || Beggs || Gornicki (1) || — || 65–81
|- bgcolor="ccffcc"
| 151 || September 27 || @ Reds || 7–4 || Brandt (1–1) || Vander Meer || Gornicki (2) || 2,070 || 66–81
|-

|-
| Legend:       = Win       = Loss       = TieBold = Pirates team member

Opening Day lineup

Roster

Player stats

Batting

Starters by position 
Note: Pos = Position; G = Games played; AB = At bats; H = Hits; Avg. = Batting average; HR = Home runs; RBI = Runs batted in

Other batters 
Note: G = Games played; AB = At bats; H = Hits; Avg. = Batting average; HR = Home runs; RBI = Runs batted in

Pitching

Starting pitchers 
Note: G = Games pitched; IP = Innings pitched; W = Wins; L = Losses; ERA = Earned run average; SO = Strikeouts

Other pitchers 
Note: G = Games pitched; IP = Innings pitched; W = Wins; L = Losses; ERA = Earned run average; SO = Strikeouts

Relief pitchers 
Note: G = Games pitched; W = Wins; L = Losses; SV = Saves; ERA = Earned run average; SO = Strikeouts

Farm system

Toronto affiliation shared with Philadelphia Athletics

Notes

References 
 1942 Pittsburgh Pirates team page at Baseball Reference
 1942 Pittsburgh Pirates Page at Baseball Almanac

Pittsburgh Pirates seasons
Pittsburgh Pirates season
Pittsburg Pir